Lucy Morgan may refer to 
 Lucy Morgan (born 1940), a reporter and editor
 Lucy Morgan, founder of the Penland School of Crafts
 Lucy Morgan, member of Dexys Midnight Runners